Mathumila (born 23 May 1988), also written as Madhumila, is a Sri Lankan born Tamil actress, TV anchor, and model. She started her career as an anchor in 2012 on Makkal TV and made her acting debut in the Tamil television serial Office, which garnered her fame. She has also appeared in some well known films such as Poojai, Romeo Juliet, and Mapla Singam.

In 2014, Mathumila won the Vijay Television Award for Favourite Find for her role as Lakshmi in the serial Office.

Personal life
Mathumila got married in 2017 and now resides in Canada with her husband. They have one child, born 20 April 2020.

Filmography

References

External links 

 

Tamil television actresses
Actresses in Tamil television
Tamil television presenters
Living people
Indian television actresses
Tamil actresses
People from Jaffna
21st-century Sri Lankan actresses
Indian women television presenters
1988 births